The Global Fellowship programme (previously The Prime Minister's Global Fellowship) works with 18- and 19-year-old students from England to give them a strong foundation in interacting with one of the three major emerging economies. It began in 2008, is funded by the Department for Education and is managed by the British Council.

Every year in July and August 100 young people are sent to Brazil, China or India to investigate issues of culture, language, education and global enterprise. The fully funded six week journey is an investigation into the social, economic and environmental effects of globalisation and learning what a positive role those on the programme can play in the process. The programme is typically split into three parts; two weeks language and cultural immersion, two weeks in a local school and staying with a host family, and two weeks as the guest of a global company.

The first two weeks involve daily language classes, combined with cultural activities and visits. This part of the programme is designed to give practical language skills and an understanding of etiquette and culture. The activities and visits are aimed at giving an insight into the contrasts inherent in the emerging economies, and the drivers behind their rapid growth.

The middle fortnight is centered on staying with a peer from the host country. By experiencing school life while living with a host family, Fellows get the opportunity to compare how education can shape the expectations of young people on opposite sides of the world.

The global companies involved in 2009 were B&Q/Kingfisher, Cadbury Schweppes, Cambridge University Press, G4S, GKN, Hays plc, HSBC, IMI plc, KPMG, Pearson Education, RSA Insurance Group, Royal Dutch Shell, Tata Consultancy Services, Virgin Atlantic and Jones Lang Lasalle. Each company took a number of Fellows, many in more than one of the countries, and provided a placement which demonstrated business in a global environment. New partners in 2010 include Arup and Natura.

The main aims of the programme are to educate Britain's young generation to understand the opportunities and challenges for them in the new global economy. It also provides them with a vehicle through which to communicate a new narrative to the general public, and gives young people a voice in what Britain needs to do in the future.

On their return all Fellows automatically become part of the Prime Minister's Global Fellowship Alumni, a network of active globally minded young people in England tasked with sharing their experiences and learning from the Fellowship experience on local and national platforms, to raise awareness of global issues.

The programme ended in March 2011 as investment was focused elsewhere.

Notes 

Department for Education
British Council